Jeremiah Joseph O'Keefe III (July 12, 1923 – August 23, 2016) was an American fighter ace, Democratic Party politician, insurance executive, and funeral director. As a Marine pilot in World War II he received the Navy Cross for five of the seven kills he recorded over Okinawa. After the war he entered politics, serving as a member of the Mississippi House of Representatives from 1960 to 1964 and as the mayor of Biloxi, Mississippi, from 1973 to 1981. The most prominent funeral home owner in Biloxi, he won a $500 million jury award in a contractual dispute with the rival funeral home company Loewen Group, later settling for $175 million.

O'Keefe was a major donor to and chief fundraiser for the Ohr-O'Keefe Museum Of Art, named after his wife Annette. His son, Jeremiah Joseph O'Keefe IV, also served as a state legislator.

Early life and education
Jeremiah O'Keefe was born in Ocean Springs, Mississippi, on July 12, 1923. His parents were J. Ben O'Keefe and Teresa Slattery O'Keefe. He was the second of four children. With his family, he moved to Biloxi, Mississippi at age thirteen because the home he was born in and lived in was lost to the family during the Depression. O'Keefe went to St. Alphonsus Elementary School and Sacred Heart Academy in Biloxi, Mississippi. After World War II, O'Keefe graduated from Loyola University, in New Orleans, Louisiana.

Military career

O'Keefe was attending Soule Business College during the attack on Pearl Harbor. He quickly enlisted in the U.S. Navy and served from 1942 to 1943. Then he became a fighter pilot with the U.S. Marine Corps from 1943 to 1945. He was a 1st Lt. with the VMF-323 Marine Squadron, known as the "Death Rattlers". He gained recognition for his contributions to an dogfight in Okinawa on April 22, 1945, in which he shot down five Japanese Kamikazes, becoming an ace in a single day. (This action was chronicled on the Dogfights TV series, the episode: Supersonic.)

On April 28, Lt. O'Keefe shot down another two enemy planes bringing his total victories to seven which made him the highest scoring ace in Okinawa at the time.

Awards
O'Keefe received the Navy Cross, the Distinguished Flying Cross and the Air Medal for his service. In connection with celebration of his 90th birthday on July 12, 2013, a bronze bust depicting him in his gear as a young aviator was installed in the Gulfport-Biloxi International Airport, honoring him as an ace and member of the Death Rattlers.  The only other person so honored with a bust in the airport is Lawrence E. Roberts, a Tuskegee Airman, Colonel in the US Air Force, recipient of the Congressional Gold Medal, and father of ABC host Robin Roberts.

Navy Cross citation
Citation:

The President of the United States of America takes pleasure in presenting the Navy Cross to First Lieutenant Jeremiah Joseph O'Keefe (MCSN: 0-25432), United States Marine Corps Reserve, for extraordinary heroism and distinguished service in the line of his profession as Section Leader and a Pilot in Marine Fighting Squadron THREE HUNDRED TWENTY-THREE (VMF-323), Marine Air Group THIRTY-THREE (MAG-33), FOURTH Marine Aircraft Wing, in aerial combat against enemy Japanese forces during the assault on Okinawa Shima, Ryukyu Islands, on 22 April 1945. Fighting his plane aggressively in two engagements against a total of more than fifty Japanese suicide dive bombers, First Lieutenant O'Keefe pressed home a series of bold attacks in the face of hostile fire to destroy five of the enemy aircraft. By his resolute courage, skillful airmanship and devotion to duty, he aided materially in preventing the numerically superior force from reaching its objective, and his gallant conduct throughout reflects the highest credit upon First Lieutenant O'Keefe and the United States Naval Service.

O'Keefe, at the age of 91, was recognized with the Congressional Gold Medal in a ceremony in his home town of Ocean Springs, MS on June 5, 2015. This medal is the highest civilian award given by Congress.

Personal life
O'Keefe and his wife, Annette Saxon O'Keefe, had 13 children, 43 grandchildren, and 33 great-grandchildren. Their family has a fondness for Southern cooking and story-telling which inspired Annette's 1994 publication of a family cookbook, Cooking on the Coast. They remained married until Annette O'Keefe's death on May 16, 1998. At the time of his death on August 23, 2016, O'Keefe was married to his second wife, Martha Peterson O'Keefe. He was buried at the Evergreen Cemetery in Ocean Springs, Mississippi.

O'Keefe was interested in civil rights and took a stand throughout his life. O'Keefe described an event that led him to being active and attentive to minority relations. While in college, he was asked to join a business fraternity. The fraternity told him that Jews and Blacks were not allowed to participate in the fraternity; O'Keefe told the fraternity that he was uninterested in joining unless they allowed minorities to participate and join. The fraternity obliged, and altered their policy allowing minorities to join. O'Keefe then became president of the fraternity for a year succeeding the policy change.

Business
The O'Keefe family has owned O'Keefe Funeral Homes since the early 1900s. In 1957 O'Keefe bought his major competitor's business, creating Bradford-O'Keefe Funeral Homes. He also founded a life insurance company, Gulf National Life.

In 1996 O'Keefe, represented by Willie E. Gary, won a jury trial concerning a contractual dispute involving his family businesses against Ray Loewen's Loewen Group. He and fellow plaintiffs were awarded $500 million in damages, a sum that would have bankrupted the defendant. O'Keefe eventually settled for a significantly lower sum of $175 million. An Amazon Studios film, The Burial (film), loosely inspired by the case, is in production at this time.

Political career
In 1954, O'Keefe was selected Outstanding Young Man of the year and later the Outstanding Citizen. He was elected to the Mississippi State Legislature in 1960 and served one term, ending 1964. He served as the Chairman of the 'Temperance Committee', fighting for liquor legalization, on a local-option basis, in Mississippi, the last remaining 'dry' state in the nation. In his freshman year he was named one of four most outstanding legislators for his service. One of his sons Jeremiah Joseph O'Keefe IV also served in the Mississippi Legislature from 1971 to 1979.

After completing his term in office, Jerry O'Keefe returned to his business and civic activities. He later was elected the Mayor of Biloxi, Mississippi for two terms from 1973 to 1981. It was during his tenure as mayor that O'Keefe stood up to the Ku Klux Klan during the Civil Rights-era which earned him death threats and a burning cross in his yard. Nevertheless, O'Keefe stood his ground then as he had in 1945 and never backed down.

Philanthropy

O'Keefe was a major financial contributor and fundraiser for both the Walter Anderson Museum of Art and the Ohr-O'Keefe Museum of Art.

He and his wife Annette also founded and endowed the O'Keefe Foundation, a charitable organization designed to support local organizations and various other charitable purposes. O'Keefe has long been active in a variety of civic organizations.

In 1967 and 1975, he was honored by the United Fund Campaign for Distinguished Service to the People of Harrison County. He also received a Lifetime Achievement Award from the Boy Scouts of America's Pine Burr Area Council.

See also 

 George C. Axtell
 Jefferson J. DeBlanc
 Archie G. Donahue
 James E. Swett
Herbert J. Valentine

References

External links

 Bradford-O'Keefe Funeral Homes History
 Oral history interview with Jeremiah J. O’Keefe from the Mississippi Oral History Program at the University of Southern Mississippi
 "WW2 Marine Fighting Squadron 323", www.acepilots.com, 17 February 2007
 Biloxi Historical Society
 Biloxi Historical Society-Biloxi Mayors and Politicians
 Video of O'Keefe family history
 Ocean Springs Archives

1923 births
2016 deaths
Mayors of Biloxi, Mississippi
Democratic Party members of the Mississippi House of Representatives
American World War II flying aces
Aviators from Mississippi
Recipients of the Navy Cross (United States)
Recipients of the Distinguished Flying Cross (United States)
Recipients of the Air Medal
Loyola University New Orleans alumni
Businesspeople from Mississippi
People from Ocean Springs, Mississippi
Military personnel from Mississippi
United States Marine Corps pilots of World War II
20th-century American businesspeople
United States Marine Corps personnel of the Vietnam War